The Tobago Volcanic Group is a geologic group in Trinidad and Tobago. It preserves radiolaria and ammonite fossils dating back to the Albian period. The formation contains the Bacolet Formation and comprises organic-rich, black pyritic siliceous mudstones and fine-grained volcaniclastic sandstones and siltstones.

See also 

 List of fossiliferous stratigraphic units in Trinidad and Tobago

References

Further reading 
 A. W. Snoke and P.J. Noble. 2001. Ammonite-radiolarian assemblage, Tobago Volcanic Group, Tobago, West Indies—Implications for the evolution of the Great Arc of the Caribbean. Geological Society America Bulletin 113:256-264

Geologic groups of North America
Geologic groups of South America
Geologic formations of Trinidad and Tobago
Cretaceous Trinidad and Tobago
Albian Stage
Volcanism of the Caribbean
Shale formations
Source rock formations
Formations